The 2007 Maplin UK Championship was a professional ranking snooker tournament that took place between 8 and 16 December 2007 at the Telford International Centre in Telford, England.

Peter Ebdon was the defending champion but he lost 8–9 to Ian McCulloch in the Last 32.

In the final frame of his quarter-final match against Marco Fu, Mark Selby won the longest ever televised frame of snooker, which lasted 77 minutes. This beat the previous record of 74 minutes, which took place between Ebdon and Graeme Dott in the 2006 World Snooker Championship final.

Ronnie O'Sullivan compiled a maximum break in the deciding frame of his semi-final match against Mark Selby, his eighth maximum, equalling the official record of tournament 147 breaks first set by Stephen Hendry. This was the second consecutive ranking tournament where he made a 147.

Ronnie O'Sullivan won his fourth UK Championship title by defeating Stephen Maguire 10–2 in the final. This came one year after O'Sullivan forfeited his quarter-final against Hendry while trailing 4–1. This was the biggest winning margin in a UK final since O'Sullivan himself thrashed Ken Doherty 10–1 six years earlier.

Prize fund
The breakdown of prize money for this year is shown below:  

Winner: £100,000
Runner-up: £46,000
Semi-final: £23,250
Quarter-finalist: £15,800
Last 16: £11,750
Last 32: £8,000
Last 48: £4,500
Last 64: £2,200

Stage one highest break: £500
Stage two highest break: £5000
Stage one maximum break: £1,000
Stage two maximum break: £25,000
Total: £590,400

Main draw

Final

Qualifying

Qualifying for the tournament took place between 23 and 30 November 2007 at Pontin's in Prestatyn, Wales.

Century breaks

Televised stage centuries

147, 137, 126, 119, 117, 112  Ronnie O'Sullivan
144, 135,  Shaun Murphy
143, 112, 100  Ding Junhui
139, 132, 111, 102  Marco Fu
139  Ali Carter
137, 133, 105  Jamie Cope
137  Ryan Day
131  Nigel Bond
130, 122, 120, 108, 106, 105, 101  Stephen Maguire

130, 120, 101, 100  Mark Selby
123, 120  Ian McCulloch
120  Graeme Dott
116  Michael Holt
115, 103  Mark Allen
111  Neil Robertson
106  Barry Hawkins
104  Stephen Hendry
100  John Higgins

Qualifying stage centuries

146  Mark Allen
141  Dominic Dale
139, 134  Tian Pengfei
138  Ben Woollaston
138  Rory McLeod
137, 133, 121  David Gray
135  Michael White
134, 100, 100  Tom Ford
133, 110, 104, 103, 100  Barry Pinches
133  Matthew Stevens
132, 120  Joe Delaney
129, 127  Fergal O'Brien
129  Kurt Maflin
128, 116, 115  Ricky Walden
123  James McBain
122  Dave Harold
119  Jamie O'Neill
116  Robert Milkins
115  Stuart Bingham

115  Mark Joyce
114  Alex Davies
114  Alan McManus
112, 103  Shailesh Jogia
112  John Parrott
112  Mark Davis
111  Andy Hicks
110  Andrew Higginson
109, 107  Mark King
109, 106  Liu Song
109  Liang Wenbo
107, 107, 100  Jamie Burnett
106  Jimmy White
105  Jimmy Michie
102  Adrian Gunnell
102  Lee Spick
101  Paul Davies
100  David Roe
100  Jamie Cope

References

2007
UK Championship
UK Championship
UK Championship